Viterbo is a province in the Lazio region of Italy. Its capital is the city of Viterbo.

Geography
Viterbo is the most northerly of the provinces of Lazio. It is bordered to the south by the Metropolitan City of Rome Capital and to the south-east by the Province of Rieti. It is also bordered by the regions of Tuscany (Province of Grosseto) to the north and by Umbria (Province of Terni) to the east. The Tyrrhenian Sea is located to the west.

The provincial president is Marcello Meroi and the province contains 60 comuni.

History

The area of the province of Viterbo contained a number of Etruscan cities including Tuscania, Vetralla, Tarquinia, and Viterbo. Viterbo was conquered by the Roman Republic in 310 BCE; despite this, minimal information is known of Viterbo until it was utilised in 773 CE by King of the Lombard Kingdom Desiderius as a base against the Holy Roman Empire. Matilda of Tuscany gifted the city to the papacy in the 11th century. Frederick I, Holy Roman Emperor was based in Viterbo as he planned to invade Rome in 1153, and Frederick I conquered the city in 1160 while preparing to attack Rome.

After a period as a free commune, in the early 13th century Viterbo became part of the Papal States. The Knights of Saint John were expelled from Rhodes in the 16th century and were temporarily granted refuge in Viterbo before they could travel to Malta. Pope Paul III described himself as a citizen of Viterbo and formed a university in the city. It joined the Kingdom of Italy on 12 September 1870 and during World War II, Viterbo was heavily bombed.

Gallery

References

External links
 

 
Viterbo